This article provides lists of famous and notable Bhojpuri people or Bhojpuriyas in the Indian subcontinent and other countries like Suriname, Mauritius, Fiji and Caribbean Countries and people with Bhojpuri ancestry or people who speak Bhojpuri as their primary language.

Actors
Bhojpuri cinema

Khesari Lal Yadav
Nazir Hussain
Neetu Chandra
Pankaj Tripathi
Akhilendra Mishra
Vishal Aditya Singh

Hindi cinema
Khesari Lal Yadav
Akhilendra Mishra
Abhimanyu Singh
Vinay Pathak
Siddhant Chaturvedi
Manoj Bajpayee
Nazir Hussain
Neetu Chandra
Padma Khanna
Pankaj Tripathi
Satyakam Anand
Sujit Kumar
Vishal Aditya Singh

Actresses
Bhojpuri cinema

Hindi cinema

Chief Ministers

Chief Ministers of Bihar (India) 
Harihar Singh (26 February 1969 – 22 June 1969)
Lalu Prasad Yadav (10 March 1990 – 25 July 1995), also served as Railway Minister in Union government (2004-2009)
Rabri Devi (1997-2005)

Dancers 

 Ramchandra Manjhi

Freedom Fighters 

 Babu Amar Singh
Indradeep Sinha
Jayaprakash Narayan
 Kunwar Singh
Mangal Pandey

Governor of Indian States 

 Anant Sharma, (10 March 1983 – 14 August 1984), 11th governor of West Bengal
Chandeshwar Prasad Narayan Singh, 18th governor of Uttar Pradesh and 2nd governor of Punjab.
Kailashpati Mishra, (7 May 2003 – 2 Jul 2004), 15th Governor of Gujarat

Journalists 

 Amitava Kumar
 Anjana Om Kashyap
 Ravish Kumar

Lyricist 

 Shailendra
S. H. Bihari

Musicians 

 Bismillah Khan, Shehnai player
Chitragupt, Music Director

National and International Award winners

Ashok Chakra 

 Jyoti Prakash Nirala

Bharat Ratna 

 Bismillah Khan
 Jayaprakash Narayan
 Rajendra Prasad

Magasaysay Award 

 Jayaprakash Narayan
 Ravish Kumar

Padma Shree 

 Narendra Kumar Pandey
Ramchandra Manjhi

Politicians

Deputy Prime Ministers of India 

 Jagjivan Ram

Deputy Chief Ministers 

 Tejashwi Yadav, Bihar (2015-2017)

Governors 

 Lallan Prasad Singh,  Governor of Assam (1973–80), Manipur (1973–80, 1982–83), Meghalaya (1973–80), Nagaland (1973–81), and Tripura (1973–80).
Ram Dulari Sinha, Governor of Kerala (1988-1990)

Lok Sabha Speakers 

 Meira Kumar, (2009-2014)

Ministers 

 Ram Subhag Singh
Tej Pratap Yadav

Presidents

Presidents of India 
 Mohammad Hidayatullah, (20 July 1969 – 24 August 1969; 6 October 1982 – 31 October 1982), Acting President of India
 Rajendra Prasad, (26 January 1950 – 13 May 1962), 1st President of India. He was born in Ziradei, a village in Chhapra, Bihar. Chhapra is a Bhojpuri speaking district.

Presidents of Seyschelles 

 Wavel Ramkalawan, 5th President of Seyschelles

Presidents of Mauritius 

 Anerood Jugnauth, (7 October 2003 – 31 March 2012), 4th President of Mauritius.
Kailash Purryag, (21 July 2012 – 29 May 2015), 5th President of Mauritius

Presidents of Guyana 
Mohamed Irfaan Ali, (2 August 2020 – ), 10th President of Guyana
Cheddi Jagan, (9 October 1992 – 6 March 1997), 4th President of Guyana
Bharrat Jagdeo, (11 August 1999 – 3 December 2011), 7th President of Guyana
Donald Ramotar, (3 December 2011 – 16 May 2015), 8th President of Guyana

Presidents of Suriname 
 Fred Ramdat Misier, (8 February 1982 – 25 January 1988), 3rd President of Suriname
 Chan Santokhi, (16 July 2020 – ), 9th President of Suriname
 Ramsewak Shankar, (25 January 1988 – 24 December 1990), 4th President of Suriname

President of Trinidad and Tobago 
 Noor Mohamed Hassanali, (20 March 1987 – 17 March 1997), 2nd President of Trinidad and Tobago

Prime Ministers

Prime Ministers of India
Lal Bahadur Shastri, (9 June 1964 – 11 January 1966), 2nd Prime Minister of India
Chandra Shekhar Singh, (10 November 1990 – 21 June 1991), 8th Prime Minister of India

Prime Ministers of Mauritius 

 Anerood Jugnauth, (17 December 2014 – 23 January 2017), 2nd Prime Minister of Mauritius
 Navin Ramgoolam, (5 July 2005 – 17 December 2014), 3rd Prime Minister of Mauritius
 Seewoosagur Ramgoolam, (12 March 1968 – 30 June 1982), 1st Prime Minister of Mauritius

Prime Minister of Suriname 
 Pretaap Radhakishun, (17 July 1986 – 7 April 1987), 6th Prime Minister of Suriname

Prime Minister of Trinidad and Tobago 

 Basdeo Panday, (9 November 1995 – 24 December 2001), 5th Prime Minister of Trinidad and Tobago
 Kamla Persad-Bissessar, (26 May 2010 – 9 September 2015), 6th Prime Minister of Trinidad and Tobago

Scholars 

 Ananda Prasad, Doctor
 Gupteshwar Pandey, Former DGP of Bihar
Kapil Muni Tiwary, Linguist
 Sachchidananda Sinha, Lawyer

Singers 
Bhojpuri cinema

Hindi cinema
Baleshwar Yadav
Bihari Lal Yadav, founder of Biraha genre
Chandan Tiwari
Hiralal Yadav
Raj Mohan
Ramdew Chaitoe
Sundar Popo

Sports Persons

Cricketers

 Sakibul Gani, First player in the world to score a Triple century on First class debut.

Footballers
 Mobashir Rahman
 Gurmeet Singh
 Sarpreet Singh

Writers 

 Acharya Shivpujan Sahay, Hindi and Bhojpuri
 Bhikhari Thakur, Bhojpuri
 Heera Dom, Bhojpuri
Rahul Sankrityayan, Bhojpuri and Hindi
Raghuveer Narayan, Bhojpuri, English and Hindi
Ram Karan Sharma, Sanskrit and English
 Teg Ali Teg, Bhojpuri
Premchand, Hindi

References 

Bhojpuri